In the Hebrew Bible, Zaham, meaning "loathing", was the son of Rehoboam, king of Judah, and Mahalath. He was a grandson of Solomon.

 notes that all of Rehoboam's sons were appointed to positions within the fortified cities of the kingdom.

References

10th-century BCE Hebrew people